Fernanda Andrade (born 8 March 1984) is a Brazilian-born American actress, model and singer. She is best known for starring in the 2012 horror film, The Devil Inside as Isabella Rossi, Special Agent Salazar in the 2020 sci-fi action thriller television show Next and for her role in the Marvel Cinematic Universe as Wendy Spector in Moon Knight.

Biography
Andrade was born in São José dos Campos, São Paulo state, but raised in Campinas. Her mother is of Italian and Spanish descent, while her father's ancestry is Portuguese, Spanish and Native Brazilian.

Her father was an engineer who traveled frequently. She moved with her family to the U.S. state of Florida when she was 11-years old when her father accepted a permanent engineering position. The move to the United States proved difficult at first, as her father was the only family member who spoke English at the time.

Career 

Andrade became interested in acting and film during high school. She was cast in her first professional role when she was 15 years old, when she appeared in the 2000 HBO biopic, For Love or Country: The Arturo Sandoval Story, which starred Andy García as the Cuban jazz musician, Arturo Sandoval. Andrade played Paloma, Sandoval's daughter-in-law, in the television film.

Andrade moved from Florida to Los Angeles when her agent relocated to Southern California. She appeared in several short films and television series during the 2000s and 2010s, including guest spots on CSI: NY and Law & Order: Los Angeles. In 2006, she starred in the ABC Family miniseries, Fallen.

In 2011, she was cast in a recurring role in season four of Sons of Anarchy.

She remained a relatively unknown actress until the debut of her 2012 horror film, The Devil Inside. The film, which stars Andrade, Simon Quarterman, Evan Helmuth, and Suzan Crowley, was produced on a shoe-string budget, but debuted in January 2012 with $34.5 million to win its opening weekend, beating out Mission: Impossible – Ghost Protocol for the #1 slot at the box office. The film eventually grossed 101.8 million. 

In 2016 she was cast as Christina Santos in the pilot episode of the Marvel's Most Wanted, but the series was not picked up by ABC.

In 2017 she was part of another pilot, this time as Mariana Silva in the USA Network show by Blumhouse Productions called Run For Your Life.  Although the pilot was not picked up she stayed busy the next few years with reoccurring roles in shows like Here and Now on HBO starring Tim Robbins and Holly Hunter, the hulu original The First starring Sean Penn and NCIS: Los Angeles as Claudia Diaz.

In 2020, she recurred in season two of Narcos: Mexico and was a lead in the FOX limited series Next opposite John Slattery.

In 2022, she portrayed Wendy Spector in the Disney+ mini series Moon Knight, part of the Marvel Cinematic Universe.

Personal life

She is fluent in Portuguese, Spanish and English.   

Andrade married musician Josh James from the band Stick to Your Guns in August 2017 in a ceremony in Pala, California and currently resides in Los Angeles.

During the COVID-19 lockdown she started a punk hardcore band called Sorry Fern with her husband. The two recorded an EP at their home where Andrade tracked her vocals in the bathtub. 250 limited cassette tapes were produced and sold with all proceeds going to various Los Angeles mutual aid groups.

Filmography

Film

Television

References

External links

1984 births
Living people
People from São José dos Campos
Brazilian people of Portuguese descent
Brazilian people of Italian descent
Brazilian people of Spanish descent
Brazilian people of Swiss descent
Brazilian people of indigenous peoples descent
Brazilian film actresses
Brazilian television actresses
Expatriate actresses in the United States
Actresses from São Paulo (state)
21st-century Brazilian actresses
Brazilian expatriates in the United States